The 2009 Billboard Latin Music Awards was held on Thursday, April 23, 2009 at the BankUnited Center at the University of Miami in Coral Gables, Florida. It is produced and broadcast lived on Telemundo network. The nominees were announced on Tuesday, February 17, 2009 during a live televised morning show Levantate on Telemundo network.

Host
Aylín Mújica
 Alan Tacher

Performers
 Aventura, Wisin & Yandel & Akon - "All Up 2 You"
 Cristian Castro - "El Culpable Soy Yo" (with special guest, Arthur Hanlon)
 Enrique Iglesias - "Lloro Por Ti"
 Paulina Rubio - "Causa y Efecto"
 Patrulla 81
 Daddy Yankee & JabbawockeeZ
 La Quinta Estación
 Flex - "Te Quiero" and "Dime Si Te Vas Con Él"
 Gloria Trevi
 Banda el Recodo
 Carlos Santana & Maná
 Don Omar - "Virtual Diva"
 Reik - "Fui"
 Rubén Blades & Los Seis Del Solar

Presenters

 Gilberto Santa Rosa
 Diana Reyes
 Jerry Rivera
 María Celeste Arrarás
 R.K.M & Ken-Y
 Kany García
 Jencarlos Canela
 Gaby Espino
 Don Omar
 Marcy Place
 Melina León
 Germán Montero
 Rashel Diaz
 K-Paz de la Sierra
 Chico Castillo
 Chenoa
 Maná
 Eddy Lover
 Demphra
 Fanny Lú
 Penélope Menchacaa
 NG2
 Maritza Rodríguez
 Catherine Siachoque
 Miguel Varoni
 Lorenzo Negrete
 Maria Fernanda Yepes
 Vin Diesel
 Yarel
 Xtreme
 Carmen Villalobos
 Aleks Syntek
 Dayana Mendoza
 Los Horóscopos de Durango
 Jorge Bernal

Special awards

Lifetime achievement award
Carlos Santana

Spirit of Hope Award
Daddy Yankee

Hall of Fame
Pablo Raúl Alarcón, Sr.

Your World Award (Premio Tu Mundo)
Luis Fonsi

Note
Winners are listed in bold.

Hot Latin Songs

Hot Latin Song of the Year
"Te Quiero" - Flex
"No me doy por vencido" - Luis Fonsi
"¿Dónde Están Corazón?" - Enrique Iglesias
"Si No Te Hubieras Ido" - Maná

Hot Latin Song of the Year Vocal Duet or Collaboration
"No Hay Nadie Como Tú" - Calle 13 featuring Café Tacuba
"Un Buen Perdedor" - K-Paz de la Sierra featuring Franco De Vita
"Aire" - Luz Rios featuring Joan Sebastian
"No Me Digas Que No" - Xtreme featuring Adrienne Bailon

Hot Latin Songs Artist of the Year
Vicente Fernández
Flex
Enrique Iglesias
Juanes

Hot Latin Song of the Year Male
(New Category)
"Para Siempre" - Vicente Fernández
"Te Quiero" - Flex
"No me doy por vencido" - Luis Fonsi
"¿Dónde Están Corazón?" - Enrique Iglesias

Hot Latin Song of the Year Female
(New Category)
"Dime" - Ivy Queen
"Culpable O Inocente" - Jenni Rivera
"Inolvidable" - Jenni Rivera
"El Presente" - Julieta Venegas

Hot Latin Song of the Year Duo or Group
(New Category)
"Dame Tu Amor" - Alacranes Musical
"Hasta el Día de Hoy" - Los Dareyes de la Sierra
"La Cumbia Del Río" - Los Pikadientes de Caborca
"Si No Te Hubieras Ido" - Maná

Hot Latin Song of the Year New
(New Category)
"Te Quiero" - Flex
"Hasta el Día de Hoy" - Los Dareyes de la Sierra
"La Cumbia Del Río" - Los Pikadientes de Caborca
"Amantes Escondidos" - German Montero

Hot Latin Songs Label of the Year
Fonovisa
Machete
Sony Music Latin
Universal Music Latino

Top Latin Albums

Latin Album of the Year
"Kings of Bachata: Sold Out at Madison Square Garden" - Aventura
"Te Quiero" - Flex
"95/08" - Enrique Iglesias
"Arde El Cielo" - Maná

Top Latin Albums Artist of the Year
Vicente Fernández
Flex
Enrique Iglesias
Marco Antonio Solís

Top Latin Album of the Year Male
(New Category)
"Te Quiero" - Flex
"95/08" - Enrique Iglesias
"Una Noche en Madrid" - Marco Antonio Solís
"Talento de Barrio (soundtrack) - Daddy Yankee

Top Latin Album of the Year Female
(New Category)
"Real... En Vivo" - Ednita Nazario
"Insatisfecha" - Diana Reyes
"Jenni - Jenni Rivera
"Julieta Venegas: MTV Unplugged" - Julieta Venegas

Top Latin Album of the Year Duo or Group
(New Category)
"Kings of Bachata: Sold Out at Madison Square Garden" - Aventura
"Arde El Cielo" - Maná
"Si Tú Te Vas" - Los Temerarios
"Tu Inspiracion" - Alacranes Musical

Top Latin Album of the Year New
(New Category)
"Wisin & Yandel Presentan: La Mente Maestra" - DJ Nesty
"Te Quiero" - Flex
"Vámonos Pa'l Río" - Los Pikadientes de Caborca
"Con Banda" - Los Dareyes de la Sierra

Top Latin Albums Label of the Year
EMI Televisa
Sony Music Latin
Universal Music Latin Entertainment
Warner Latina

Latin Pop

Latin Pop Airplay Song of the Year, Male
"Te Quiero" - Flex
"No me doy por vencido" - Luis Fonsi
"¿Dónde Están Corazón?" - Enrique Iglesias
"Gotas de Agua Dulce" - Juanes

Latin Pop Airplay Song of the Year, Female
"Donde Estara Mi Primavera" - Myriam Hernández
"Cinco Minutos" - Gloria Trevi
"El Presente" - Julieta Venegas
"Ahora Entendi" - Yuridia

Latin Pop Airplay Song of the Year, Duo or Group
"Cada Que..." - Belanova
"No Te Quiero Nada" - Ha*Ash
"Si No Te Hubieras Ido" - Maná
"Inolvidable" - Reik

Latin Pop Airplay Label of the Year
EMI Televisa
Sony Music Latin
Universal Music Latino
Warner Latina

Latin Pop Album of the Year, Solo
"5to Piso" - Ricardo Arjona
"Palabras del Silencio" - Luis Fonsi
"95/08" - Enrique Iglesias
"Cómplices" - Luis Miguel

Latin Pop Album of the Year, Duo or Group
"Mejores Cantos Religiosos" - Grupo Nueva Vida
"Arde El Cielo" - Maná
"Planeta Kumbia" - A.B. Quintanilla Presenta Kumbia All Starz
"Hasta Ahora" - Sin Bandera

Latin Pop Albums Label of the Year
EMI Televisa
Sony Music Latin
Universal Music Latin Entertainment
Warner Latina

Tropical

Tropical Airplay Song of the Year, Male
"Sin Perdon" - Hector Acosta
"Donde Estan Esos Amigos" - El Chaval De La Bachata
"Te Quiero" - Flex
"Amor Desperdiciado" - Frank Reyes

Tropical Airplay Song of the Year, Female
"Píntame De Colores" - Gloria Estefan
"Quiero Tenerte" - Marala
"Dime" - Ivy Queen
"Cosas del Amor" - Olga Tañón featuring Milly Quezada

Tropical Airplay Song of the Year, Duo or Group
"En Aquel Lugar" - Adolescent's Orquesta
"El Perdedor" - Aventura
"Todo Lo Que Soy" - Marcy Place Featuring Don Omar
"Ahora Es" - Wisin & Yandel

Tropical Airplay Label of the Year
EMI Televisa
J & N
Machete
Sony Music Latin

Tropical Album of the Year, Solo
"Mitad/Mitad" - Hector Acosta
"Historia De Un Sonero" - Víctor Manuelle
"Soy" - Víctor Manuelle
"Una Navidad Con Gilberto" - Gilberto Santa Rosa

Tropical Album of the Year, Duo or Group
"K.O.B. Live" - Aventura
"Buena Vista Social Club At Carnegie Hall" - Buena Vista Social Club
"En Vivo Desde Bellas Artes" - Monchy y Alexandra
"Chapter Dos" - Xtreme

Tropical Albums Label of the Year
EMI Televisa
Emusica
Sony Music Latin
Universal Music Latin Entertainment

Regional Mexican

Regional Mexican Airplay Song of the Year, Male
"Para Siempre" - Vicente Fernández
"La Derrota" - Vicente Fernández
"Amantes Escondidos" - German Montero
"El Proximo Viernes" - Isidro Chavez "Espinoza Paz" Espinoza

Regional Mexican Airplay Song of the Year, Female
"Culpable O Inocente" Jenni Rivera
"Inolvidable" - Jenni Rivera
"Me Muero" - Diana Reyes
"Aire" - Luz Rios Featuring Joan Sebastian

Regional Mexican Airplay Song of the Year, Duo Or Group
"Dame Tu Amor" - Alacranes Musical
"Y Que Quede Claro" - La Arrolladora Banda El Limón
"Hasta el Día de Hoy" - Los Dareyes de la Sierra
"La Cumbia del Río" - Los Pikadientes de Caborca

Regional Mexican Airplay Label of the Year
ASL
Disa
Fonovisa
Sony Music Latin

Regional Mexican Album of the Year, Solo Artist
"Primera Fila" - Vicente Fernández
"Jenni" - Jenni Rivera
"Una Noche en Madrid" - Marco Antonio Solís
"No Molestar" - Marco Antonio Solís

Regional Mexican Album of the Year, Duo Or Group
"Tu Inspiración" - Alacranes Musical
"Con Banda" - Los Dareyes de la Sierra
"Si Tú Te Vas" - Los Temerarios
"Vámonos Pa'l Río" - Los Pikadientes de Caborca

Regional Mexican Albums Label of the Year
EMI Televisa
Sony Music Latin
Three Sound
Universal Music Latin Entertainment

Latin Rhythm

Latin Rhythm Airplay Song of the Year, Solo
(New Category)
"Permitame" - Tony Dize
"Te Quiero" - Flex
"Dime" - Ivy Queen
"Pose" - Daddy Yankee

Latin Rhythm Airplay Song of the Year, Duo or Group
(New Category)
"Na De Na" - Angel & Khriz
"El Perdedor" - Aventura
"Ahora Es" - Wisin & Yandel
"Síguelo" - Wisin & Yandel

Latin Rhythm Airplay Label of the Year
EMI Televisa
Machete
Sony Music Latin
Universal Music Latino

Latin Rhythm Album of the Year, Solo
(New Category)
"Wisin & Yandel Presentan: La Mente Maestra" - DJ Nesty
"La Melodía de la Calle" - Tony Dize
"Te Quiero" - Flex
"Talento de Barrio (soundtrack) - Daddy Yankee

Latin Rhythm Album of the Year, Duo Or Group
(New Category)
"La Novela" - Akwid
"Nuevas Metas" - La Factoría
"The Royalty: La Realeza" - RKM & Ken-Y
"Wisin vs. Yandel: Los Extraterrestres" - Wisin & Yandel

Latin Rhythm Albums Label of the Year
EMI Televisa
Interscope Geffen A&M
Sony Music Latin
Universal Music Latin Entertainment

Touring

Latin Tour of the Year
Alejandro Fernández
Vicente Fernández
Luis Miguel
RBD - Gira del Adiós World Tour

Digital

Latin RingMasters of the Year
"Cyclone" - Baby Bash Featuring T-Pain
"Te Quiero" - Flex
"Perdoname" - La Factoría
"La Cumbia Del Río" - Los Pikadientes de Caborca

Latin Digital Download Artist of the Year
(New Category)
Aventura
Enrique Iglesias
Pitbull
Shakira

Greatest Hits/Compilations

Latin Greatest Hits Album of the Year
"95/08" - Enrique Iglesias
"20 Aniversario" - Los Tucanes de Tijuana
"La Historia" - El Chapo de Sinaloa
"Puro Exitos Chacas" - Los Cuates de Sinaloa

Latin Compilation Album of the Year
"18 Exitos: Sonidero Hits Vol. 3" - Various Artists
"Banda # 1's" - Various Artists
"Duranguense # 1's" - Various Artists
"Idolos De Mexico Para El Mundo" - Various Artists

Latin Rock/Alternative

Latin Rock/Alternative Album of the Year
"Arde El Cielo" - Maná
"Mediocre" - Ximena Sariñana
"Julieta Venegas:MTV Unplugged" - Julieta Venegas
"Realmente lo Mejor" - Julieta Venegas

Songwriter/Publishers/Producers

Songwriter of the Year
Juan Esteban Aristizabal
Isidro Chavez "Espinoza Paz" Espinoza
Joan Sebastian
Marco Antonio Solís

Publisher of the Year
Arpa, BMI
EMI Blackwood, BMI
Sony/ATV Discos, ASCAP
WB Music, ASCAP

Publishing Corporation of the Year
Arpa Music
EMI Music
Universal Music
Warner/Chappell Music

Producer of the Year
Armando Avila
Irving Dominguez
Fher Olvera & Alex González
Joan Sebastian

References

Billboard Latin Music Awards
Latin Billboard Music Awards
Latin Billboard Music Awards
Latin Billboard Music Awards
Latin Billboard Music
2000s in Miami